Events in the year 1660 in Norway.

Incumbents
Monarch: Frederick III

Events
January - Swedish forces laid siege the town of Halden.
22 February - The siege of Halden ends, and the Swedish forces retreat to Bohuslen.
27 May - Trondhjems len was returned to Norway, following the Treaty of Copenhagen (after having been ceded to Sweden at the Treaty of Roskilde in 1658).
8 December - Ove Bjelke became Chancellor of Norway.

Full date unknown
Claus von Ahlefeldt was appointed commander-in-chief of the Norwegian army.

Arts and literature

Births

4 November – Albert Angell, civil servant, landowner and businessperson (died 1705).
Vincens Budde, military officer (died 1729).
Henrik Adeler,  civil servant and politician (died 1718).

Probable
Ragnhild Abelset, merchant, landowner and lensmann (died 1733).

Deaths

See also

References